Kam Sheung Road is an MTR station on the , located between Pat Heung and Kam Tin in Hong Kong. Kam Sheung Road was the arena for the KCR West Rail's opening ceremony.

History 
On 20 December 2003, Kam Shueng Road station opened to the public along with other KCR West Rail stations.

Hence, Kam Sheung Road was included in the project and is now an intermediate station on the Tuen Ma line.

Description
The station is an elevated structure along the viaduct to the north of one of the two rail depots of the Tuen Ma line. The MTR Kam Tin Building is just north of the station building and once housed the West Rail control centre, but the facility relocated to the main MTR control centre in Tsing Yi after the railway merger.

The station itself is a short distance from the actual rural towns of Kam Tin or Pat Heung. Originally there were various choices as to the station's name, but residents from nearby could not decide upon the name of the settlements that the station would be named after, so the main road nearest to the station was used instead.

Although the station was not expected to have high passenger patronage relative to others, the station attracted a number of villagers from Kam Tin and Pat Heung since the Tuen Ma line is their only direct link to the urban areas in Kowloon.

From 26 September to 28 November 2004, the West Rail Sightseeing Bus was introduced, attracting thousands of Kowloon residents and causing long queues for the buses.

There is a flea market beside the station building with more than 150 stalls. The station is also close to the Shek Kong Airfield.

Future expansion 
The link would also serve as a connection to the border checkpoints to mainland China while also facilitating travels between Eastern and Western New Territories. The project is under development.

Station layout

Platforms 1 and 2 share the same island platform. Although the train tracks are exposed from above, platform screen doors are still fitted.

Entrances/exits
 A: MTR Kam Tin Building 
 B: Kam Sheung Road 
 C: Public Transport Interchange 
 D: Kam Ho Road

Gallery

References

MTR stations in the New Territories
West Rail line
Tuen Ma line
Former Kowloon–Canton Railway stations
Pat Heung
Kam Tin
Yuen Long District
Railway stations in Hong Kong opened in 2003